Luzerner Zeitung (LZ) is a Swiss German-language daily newspaper, published in Lucerne.

History and profile
Luzerner Zeitung was created in 1996 through the merger of Luzerner Zeitung (LZ) and Luzerner Neuste Nachrichten (LNN). Luzerner Zeitung (1991–1996) had replaced the two daily newspapers Luzerner Tagblatt and Vaterland. The paper is owned by AG für die Neue Zürcher Zeitung which also owns Neue Zürcher Zeitung and St. Galler Tagblatt. Its editor-in-chief is Thomas Bornhauser.

The newspaper is published in six regional editions:

In 1997 Neue Luzerner Zeitung had a circulation of 131,761 copies. Its circulation was 133,000 copies in 2003. According to WEMF AG, the newspaper had a certified distribution of 134,526 copies and a readership of 290,000. The 2006 circulation of the paper was 131,004 copies. It was 127,244 copies in 2009.

See also
 List of newspapers in Switzerland

References

External links
 luzernerzeitung.ch (in German), the newspaper's official website

1996 establishments in Switzerland
Daily newspapers published in Switzerland
German-language newspapers published in Switzerland
Publications established in 1996
Mass media in Lucerne